Kaldbak is a village in the Faroe Islands, on Streymoy's east coast and part of Tórshavn Municipality. The village lies on the northern side of the fjord Kaldbaksfjørður.

History
Excavations show that Kaldbak was already inhabited by the 11th century. The parish church in Kaldbak was built in 1835. The village was only connected to the Streymoy road system in 1980.

Notable people
Notable people that were born or lived in Kaldbak include:
Knút Wang (1917–1976), journalist and politician

See also
 List of towns in the Faroe Islands

References

External links

Faroeislands.dk: Kaldbak Images and description of all cities on the Faroe Islands.

Populated places in the Faroe Islands